Nadine Woodward (born January 27, 1962) is an American politician serving as the mayor of Spokane, Washington. She succeeded David Condon in December 2019. Prior to her election, Woodward worked as a television presenter.

Early life and education 
Raised in Vancouver, Washington, Woodward graduated from Hudson's Bay High School in 1980 before attending the University of Portland, graduating in 1985 with a Bachelor of Science degree.

Career 
After working at television stations in Idaho, Woodward moved to Spokane, Washington in 1990, where she worked for KREM and KXLY-TV.

Woodward's campaign for mayor was initially managed by Eleanor Baumgartner, wife of Republican politician Michael Baumgartner, and supported by incumbent mayor David Condon. Despite describing herself as nonpartisan, Woodward was supported by a number of Republican-leaning groups, and stated her opposition to Hillary Clinton in the 2016 United States presidential election.

References

Living people
American television journalists
American women television journalists
Mayors of Spokane, Washington
Washington (state) Republicans
University of Portland alumni
Politicians from Vancouver, Washington
Women mayors of places in Washington (state)
21st-century American politicians
1962 births
21st-century American women politicians